Jesse Huhtala (born May 9, 1993) is a Finnish professional ice hockey player. He is currently playing for Karhu HT of the Suomi-sarja.

Huhtala played five games in the SM-liiga for Ässät during the 2012–13 SM-liiga season.

References

External links

1993 births
Living people
Ässät players
Finnish ice hockey forwards
Kokkolan Hermes players
KOOVEE players
Lempäälän Kisa players
Sportspeople from Pori